Akarshan is a 1988 Bollywood romantic film directed by Tanvir Ahmed. It stars Akbar Khan and Sonu Walia in lead roles.

Cast
 Akbar Khan as Abhishek
 Sonu Walia as Priya
 Sharon Prabhakar
 Rohini Hattangadi as Didi
 Girish Karnad
 Parveen Babi
 Smita Patil
 Deepak Qazir
 Suparna Anand

Music
"Ae Khuda Yeh Bata, Aisa Hota Hai Kyun" - Bhupinder Singh
"Mausam Ka Taqaaza Hai" - Ajit Singh, Kavita Krishnamurthy
"Faasla Rahe Na ye Aaj Ek Ho Jaaye" - Kavita Krishnatmurthy
"Zindagi Waqt Ka Aaina Hai" - Ajit Singh, Kavita Krishnamurthy
"O Mere Yaar O Mere Pyar" - Kishore Kumar

References

External links
 

1988 films
1980s Hindi-language films
1988 romantic drama films
Films scored by Bappi Lahiri
Hindi-language romance films